Dominic "Mac" Anthony Cara (November 11, 1914 – April 16, 1993) was an American football end in the National Football League for the Pittsburgh Pirates.  He played college football at North Carolina State University and was drafted in the tenth round of the 1937 NFL Draft.

After his NFL career ended, Cara served as an assistant coach in college coaching wide receivers and tight ends at Georgetown University (1948), Mississippi State University (1949–1953), and University of Florida (1954–1959).

References

External links

1914 births
1993 deaths
American football wide receivers
Florida Gators football coaches
Pittsburgh Pirates (football) players